For lists of colleges and universities in Saskatchewan, see:
 List of colleges in Canada#Saskatchewan
 List of universities in Canada#Saskatchewan